(born 13 February 1965, in Takamatsu, Kagawa Prefecture) is a Japanese television host and comedian. He is known as the boke of the manzai duo Utchan Nanchan with Teruyoshi Uchimura.

Career
In 1985, while attending the Yokohama Broadcasting Technical School, Kiyotaka was in the same class as Uchimura, Tetsurō Degawa and Masato Irie.

He decided to perform with Uchimura as a manzai duo and was given the name "Utchan, Nanchan" by his teacher, Keiko Utsumi. They appeared on The Birth of a Comedian! show (お笑いスター誕生!!). The next year they won the competition and received the "New Duo" award. In 1992 Utchan Nanchan won the Japanese Academy Award for "Best New Actors" for their role in the movie Cult Seven (七人のおたく). In 1999 they crossed the English Channel on their TV show, Utchan Nanchan's Urinari.

Nanbara had his first job as host in the puroresu and mixed martial arts variety show Ring Soul, which lasted from April 1994 to March 2000 in Asahi TV. He initially formed a host duo with Ken Ishiguro, but had to continue the show's tenure alone due to Ishiguro's movie schedule. His popularly in Ring Soul granted him special guest appearances in the All Japan Pro Wrestling Relay show and the game show Cult Q, where he introduced puroresu-themed quizzes.

On the 1998 television program The Real Side of Un'nan (in the episode broadcast on October 28, 1998 on TBS Television), personalities claiming to have experienced the Mariko Aoki phenomenon—including Nanbara, Maako Kido, Seiko Ito and Keisuke Horibe - carried out extensive tests that also featured experts. There was a big response to this broadcast, and the program featured special segments related to this topic on multiple occasions thereafter (such as in the episode broadcast on January 20, 1999).

In 2001 he led the comedy musical group Happa-tai, whose song "Yatta" became an internet meme. After releasing the song, Nanbara became a member of Japanese musical group Memory Cats.

From 1998 to current day, Nanbara works as a host to the Asahi TV sports show Get Sports, along with former football player Tetsuo Nakanishi.

References

External links

 

1965 births
Living people
People from Kagawa Prefecture
Japanese comedians
People from Takamatsu, Kagawa